Pelt-e Kalleh Sar (also Romanized as Pelţ-e Kalleh Sar; also known as Pelt-e Kalleh Sarā) is a village in Siahkalrud Rural District, Chaboksar District, Rudsar County, Gilan Province, Iran. At the 2006 census, its population was 69, in 24 families.

References 

Populated places in Rudsar County